Christopher James Hadnagy is an American author and information technology security consultant.

Career
Hadnagy is the founder and CEO of Social-Engineer LLC, a company that provides education and training related to social engineering. He is a founder of Social-Engineer.Org, an IT security education website, and Innocent Lives Foundation, an organization that aims to identify people involved in child trafficking.

Hadnagy is also an adjunct professor at the University of Arizona's Center of Academic Excellence in Cyber Operations.

DEF CON 
In February 2022, Hadnagy was banned permanently from hacker conference DEF CON, where he operated a colocated event ("village"), for unspecified code of conduct violations, as announced in the organization's transparency report: "We received multiple CoC violation reports about a DEF CON Village leader, Chris Hadnagy of the SE Village. After conversations with the reporting parties and Chris, we are confident the severity of the transgressions merits a ban from DEF CON."

In Hadnagy's response on his blog, he said that he disagrees with the ban, that he had not been informed of the details of any allegations by DEF CON representatives, and that a person affiliated with DEF CON told him they were not related to sexual misconduct. In August 2022, he sued DEF CON for harm to his reputation. Other people in the information security field were concerned that this lawsuit was an effort to expose information about the people who reported the code of conduct violations. The lawsuit was dismissed in January 2023 for lack of personal jurisdiction.

BSides Cleveland 
In fall of 2021, BSides Cleveland included Hadnagy on the agenda of speakers for its June 2022 event. Leading up to the event, the organizer labeled Hadnagy's speaking slot as "special guest" instead of listing his name, so attendees and other speakers did not know he would be speaking. His talk was about cancel culture, which he had also presented at a different BSides event last year. After Hadnagy gave his presentation, several other speakers pulled out of the event, and attendees and other people in the information security community criticized the event for hiding his name. Some said that they would not have attended the event if they had known he would be a speaker.

Books
In 2018, Ben Rothke and Bill Varhol positively reviewed Social Engineering: The Science of Human Hacking. Rothke also reviewed "Unmasking the Social Engineer: The Human Element of Security. Maria Patricia Prandini from Isaca Journal Book Reviews reviewed Phishing Dark Waters: The Offensive and Defensive Sides of Malicious E-mails.

Publications 
Human Hacking: Win Friends, Influence People, and Leave Them Better Off for Having Met You, Christopher Hadnagy, Seth Schulman, 2021, Harper Business
Social Engineering: The Science of Human Hacking, Christopher Hadnagy, 2018, John Wiley & Sons Inc.
Phishing Dark Waters: The Offensive and Defensive Sides of Malicious, by Christopher Hadnagy, Michele Fincher and Robin Dreeke, 2015, John Wiley & Sons Inc.
Unmasking the Social Engineer: The Human Element of Security, Christopher Hadnagy, 2014, John Wiley & Sons, Inc.
Social Engineering: The Art of Human Hacking, Christopher Hadnagy, 2010, Wiley Publishing, Inc.

References

External links 
Innocent Lives Foundation

American computer specialists
21st-century American male writers
Year of birth missing (living people)
Living people
Social engineering (computer security)